, also known as Anatolia Story, is a Japanese manga series written and illustrated by Chie Shinohara. It was published by Shōgakukan in their Sho-Comi magazine from January 1995 to June 2002. It was collected in 28 tankōbon volumes. It is published in English in North America by Viz Media.

As of March 2019, the manga had over 20 million copies in circulation, making it one of the best-selling manga series. In 2001, Red River won the Shogakukan Manga Award for the shōjo category.

Synopsis

Setting
The story takes place during the reign of King Suppiluliuma I, at a time when the Hittite Empire was near its peak of power, rivaled only by Egypt, which was then ruled by the young Pharaoh Tutankhamen. Many of the people and events in the story are drawn from actual history, from Princes Kail Mursili, Sari Arnuwanda, and Zannanza, to battles with the neighboring Mitanni kingdom around the town of Kizzuwatna.

Plot
Red River is about a fifteen-year-old Japanese girl named Yuri Suzuki, who time travels to Hattusa, the capital of the Hittite Empire in Anatolia. She was summoned by Queen Nakia who means to use Yuri as a human sacrifice. Yuri's blood is the key element needed in placing a curse upon the princes of the land so that they will perish, leaving Nakia's son as the sole heir to the throne. As the story progress, however, Yuri not only repeatedly manages to escape Nakia's scheming, she also becomes revered as an incarnation of the goddess Ishtar and falls in love with prince Kail.

Characters

Main

The main character of the story. Only fifteen at the start of the series, Yuri is willing to take up any charitable cause. Despite this, Yuri is insecure and a tomboy; she generally prefers to dress in men's clothing for the sake of practicality, much to the consternation and dismay of her handmaids. Much is made of the general opinion that she is "not strikingly beautiful" and "possesses little womanly charm" (although through the perseverance of her handmaids, she has sometimes been shown to be transformed into a stunning beauty); however, her natural charm, goodness, and selflessness win her the undying affection and loyalty of many people, both Hittites and their enemies. She is a middle-school accomplished gymnast, and during her stay in Hattusa, she learns the arts of sword fighting and archery, so that she can better help Kail survive on his own.
Yuri falls in love with Kail soon in the story. Torn between her return to her time and her love for Kail and his love for her, Yuri finally decides to stay in Anatolia forever. In a desperate attempt to overthrow Queen Nakia, she raises a private army and unites other factions loyal to her and Kail, and eventually succeeds in deposing Queen Nakia once and for all and ascending to the title Tawananna, the Hittite Queen, and marries Kail.

Historically speaking, Yuri is most likely based on Puduhepa, the priestess of Ishtar who married King Hattusili III. She has been referred to as "one of the most influential women known from the Ancient Near East." She played an important role in diplomacy with Egypt and was a co-signatory in the Ulmi-Teshub treaty.

The third prince of the Hittite empire, son of King Suppililiuma and the second Tawananna, Queen Hinti. He is described as attractive and beautiful. At the beginning of the series, he finds Yuri running frantically from Nakia's guards, and gives her the gift of understanding and speaking their language by way of a kiss.  He rescues Yuri from sacrifice by claiming to have taken her virginity, and takes her as a concubine to keep up appearances. He finds Yuri to be quite unlike any woman he has ever met, and promises to help her find a way home to Japan, while struggling with his own growing love and desire for her.  He initially calls Yuri his concubine and the incarnate form of Ishtar in order to protect her from Queen Nakia, but even he begins to believe his own tale after a while, and the legend of Yuri as Ishtar and his growing love for her eventually evolve beyond his control.

Kail is loyal to those he cares for, but constantly at odds with his stepmother, the third Tawananna, Queen Nakia; her lust for taking the throne for her son, Prince Juda, is his prime motivation for finding a woman who he can love unconditionally and whose personality would be that of a true queen.  A powerful priest and sorcerer in his own right, he has the ability to control wind and air, and is one of the few who can counter Nakia's spells in any way.  Part way through the series, in volume 12, he ascends to the throne as King Mursili II. He is kind as well as loyal to his country and because of this many are willing to follow him. He is a strong tactician and is charismatic as a prince and as an emperor. He wishes for a world without war and as king will strive for that goal.

Enemies

The third and current Tawananna (queen) of the Hittite Empire. A former princess of Babylonia, Nakia was sent to Suppililiuma at the age of 15 in exchange for monetary aid. Desperately lonely and jealous of the emperor's second wife Queen Hinti, Nakia offered all of her jewelry to Urhi and begged him to escape with her to start a new life. When he claimed he could not give her the life and children she deserved, she reluctantly "fulfilled her duty" and gave birth to Prince Juda. Because Juda bore little to no resemblance to Suppililiuma, Nakia dedicated her life to ensuring that he assumed the Hittite throne by any means necessary.

It was Nakia's spell that took Yuri from her original time frame, and she intended to use Yuri's blood as part of a curse to kill the five princes ahead of her son in line for the throne. Foiled by Prince Kail in her initial attempts to secure Yuri, Nakia constantly and shamelessly manipulates people and situations to her benefit. Her schemings come to an end, however, when her son Juda publicly attacks her for her evil deeds, screaming that he renounces the royal throne; she is subsequently deposed and placed under his supervision.

Nakia is a high priestess, and she has control over water, using certain kinds of enchanted water as a form of mind control. The character is loosely based on the historical Tawananna Mal-Nikal of Babylon.

Nakia's personal servant, an assassin who usually takes the guise of a royal priest. He takes advantage of his position and his uncommonly feminine appearance to gain the trust of people to be used in Nakia's plots against Yuri and Prince Kail. His surname is not well known, and is used when he chooses to go incognito. Under his robes, he hides a number of whipping scars. In Volume 11, he loses an eye to Rusafa and wears an ornate eyepatch for most of the rest of the series.

A former member of a royal family, Urhi's nation was invaded and destroyed when he was a young boy. Taken captive by the invading nation's commander, he was savagely beaten (leaving the scars on his back), raped and later castrated to ensure that his family's bloodline would not continue. He arrived in Hattusa after being purchased to serve as a priest in the seraglio temple.

Urhi is initially rumored to be the true father of Prince Juda; this is proven false when his castration is revealed. However, he and Nakia did share a strong romantic interest in each other.

The crown prince of the Mitanni kingdom, son of King Tushratta, and younger brother of Nefertiti. Called the "Prince of Darkness" for his ruthless demeanor and behavior at war, he launches a campaign against the Hittites and kidnaps Yuri in an attempt to demoralize them. This strategy fails, as the Mitanni people rally around Yuri when she tends to the injured and sick in the capital, and even Mattiwaza himself is eventually won over by Yuri's charm. When the Mitanni kingdom is completely overrun and the king murdered by his own soldiers, Mattiwaza releases Yuri, abdicates the throne, and departs with his head concubine Nadia. In volume 23, having received a pardon from Kail, Mattiwaza returns as an ally of the Hitties against the Egyptians and is now the new ruler of the Mitanni kingdom.

During her captivity, Mattizawa reveals to Yuri that his sister Tatukia was sold to the Egyptians to be a queen, and is now known as Nefertiti. Though Mattiwaza and Tatukia were siblings, they had an affair when younger. Her change from a caring sister and lover to a cold and calculating schemer had a severe effect on Mattizawa; while he ruled his people with intelligence and consideration, he had no compassion for the lives and feelings of others - until he met Yuri. The jewel Mattiwaza wears of his forehead is a memento of his love for his sister, and this memento is passed on to Yuri, who wears it around her neck for much of the rest of the series.

The character is loosely based on the historical Shattiwaza of Mitanni, who was actually the brother of Tushratta and uncle of Tadukhipa, who is sometimes erroneously identified with Nefertiti.

Nefertiti (Tatukia or Tadukhipa)
A famous queen of Egypt, once a princess of Mitanni, and the blood sister of Mattiwaza, with whom she had an affair when they were younger. She was sold to Egypt to solidify the legitimacy of the Mitanni kingdom, and was married to Amenhotep IV (Akhenaten). In many ways she is the Egyptian counterpart of Queen Nakia: a powerful and influential schemer working for her own desires, not for the welfare of the people or the nation. It is suggested that she has her hand in Tutankhamen's death, and she also conspires with Nakia for the downfall of the Hittite empire.

A fictionalized conflation of the historical Tadukhipa and Nefertiti. Modern Egyptologists are of the opinion that these women were two different wives of Akhenaten.

In the English version, instead of the more conforming version of her name listed above, the spelling 'Tatukia' is used.

Zuwa
The leader of the fierce Kashuga (Kaska) tribe, who works for Queen Nakia. Larger than the average man, he is also very bloodthirsty and sadistic, collecting the skins of his human victims, much like a hunter would collect the skins of animals, and crafting his attire from them. After killing Tito, he meets his end, outmaneuvered and outsmarted, by Yuri's hands, who shatters his outsized copper sword and the mud bricks beneath his feet with an iron blade, causing him to fall to his death from the palace walls.

Royalty
King Suppililiuma 
 The ruler of the Hittites, by the beginning of the story he is already advanced in years.  He has fought several wars with the Mitanni and the Egyptians, and his reign is considered to be a high point in the history of the people. He later falls victim to the Seven Day Fever.

Queen Hinti
The late second wife of King Suppiluliuma and Kail's mother. From the flashbacks and mentionings scattered throughout the story, she is depicted as a gentle, caring queen and mother. She was murdered by Nakia so that she could usurp the position of Tawananna.

Sari Arnuwanda 
The Crown Prince, oldest son of King Suppiluliuma and the King's first wife.  Largely invalid, he relies heavily on his brothers, specifically Zannanza and Kail, in order to fulfill his duties.  After he ascends to the throne, he in turn picks Kail to be his heir, as he has no sons. Shortly afterwards, he is assassinated by Urhi, and Yuri gets blamed for his murder.

Zannanza Hattusili 
The fourth son of King Suppiluliuma (with a palace maid), he is very skilled with swords and military tactics, and is the mayor of the Hittite city of Kadesh.  Prince Zannanza is very fond of Kail, whom he regards as a full brother, and he was also raised by Kail's mother after his own mother died. He also falls in love with Yuri, which unfortunately is exploited by Queen Nakia. Zannanza is very loyal to Kail, and despite his feelings, does not try to get in the way of the relationship between Kail and Yuri.  He is betrothed to Ankhesenamen, the widow of Tutankhamen, in an attempt to make peace between the Hittites and Egypt, but never arrives at his destination, getting assassinated en route. Only Yuri, who accompanied him, escapes to bring news of his death.

Juda Haspasrupi 
The sixth son of King Suppiluliuma and the current Tawananna, Queen Nakia.  Despite his mother's constant and blatantly evil scheming, Prince Juda is a kind boy who does not understand his mother's enmity towards his beloved brothers, particularly his favorite, Kail. He has a strong interest in astronomy, and despite his (for modern times comparatively) young age (14 when he is first introduced) he is mentioned to have at least one wife and two concubines. His dream is to serve as a domestic advisor to Kail, whom he wishes to become king, and he thinks of Yuri as an older sister.

Juda falls victim to his mother's schemes quite often, but he is an unwilling pawn who must be controlled by magic to cooperate.  When he eventually discovers the truth behind his mother's schemes, he attempts suicide.  He later tries to slay his mother for attempted murder upon Yuri in a fit of rage, permanently renouncing his right of succession to the throne as his protest against Nakia and his support for Yuri and Kail, before Yuri and Kail intervene.

Rois Telipinu
The second son of King Suppililiuma (with a concubine), he is not considered to be one of the serious claimants to the throne and is largely relegated to royal ceremonies. He is the mayor of the Hittite city of Haleb.

Mali Piyasili
The fifth son of King Suppililiuma and mayor of Karkemish. He is stabbed by Ramses in battle and later dies from his wounds.

Nepis Ilra
Kail's older half-sister and a priestess. She is blind from birth.

Servants
Tito 
Yuri's first true friend after her arrival in Anatolia. Tito is a servant in the palace, but also the only son of Talos, the head of the Hatti clan, and the inheritor of the secret of iron-making.  While helping Yuri escape from Queen Nakia, he is murdered by Nakia's servant, Zuwa. Ultimately, it is her desire to avenge Tito's death that causes Yuri to stay even when given the chance of returning home. Yuri is framed for the death, and his sisters attempt to kill her in retaliation.  Tito is finally avenged when Yuri defeats Zuwa and reveals him as the true killer. In gratitude, Talos granted Tito's inheritance to Yuri, and Tito's sisters take his place in the royal household.

Hadi 
The eldest sister of Tito, she is an intelligent and skilled fighter. Urged on by Urhi, she and her sisters tried to kill Yuri in order to avenge Tito's death, but after finding out the truth, they pledge their lives as Yuri's handmaids.  Though Hadi admires Yuri for her bravery and kindness, her attempts to get Yuri to be more traditionally feminine have very mixed results.

Ryui and Shala 
Twin sisters of Hadi and Tito, both loyal and capable fighters in their own right.  Along with Hadi, they pledge their lives as Yuri's loyal handmaids.  Both of them often conspire with Hadi and Kikkuri to draw Kail and Yuri closer together, and eventually, both Ryui and Shala become romantically involved with Kikkuri, due to similar tastes and personalities.

Kikkuri 
Prince Kail's servant, who goes everywhere with him.  Though quite cautious and timid by nature, he is not above conspiring with Yuri's handmaids and working behind Kail's back in order to encourage him to "settle down" with Yuri.  In an omake chapter at the end of the story, he writes a horse care manual that is in modern day times discovered in the ruins of the old Hittite empire. The character is loosely based on historical Kikkuli, the master horse trainer of the land Mitanni.

Ilbani 
Prince Kail's strategic adviser, foster brother, palace steward, and childhood friend.  Though very serious and formal, Ilvani has a dry wit and an insatiable urge to find a wife for Prince Kail. (He can also appear from behind curtains at will.)  At first unsure of Yuri's intentions and suitability, he quickly decides that Yuri is the perfect wife for Kail and the best possible candidate to unseat Nakia as Tawananna.  He is one of the few to consistently see through Queen Nakia's plots and has been known to manipulate Urhi to benefit his counter schemes. He is also very resourceful; at one time, Yuri says that the reason why Ilbani is so trusted is because he can "find advantages in the most outrageous situations." His loyalty to Kail and Yuri often seems rooted in a greater loyalty to the Hittite nation on the whole.

Ursula 
Initially used as a pawn by Queen Nakia, she is introduced as a false Ishtar in a town ravaged by the Seven Day Fever.  When unveiled by Prince Kail and subsequently forgiven, she joins Yuri's retinue as a handmaid.  She falls in love with Kash, and they become betrothed, but she ultimately sacrifices her life for Yuri when Yuri is falsely accused of the assassination of King Arnuwanda.  Before her execution, she gives her hair to Kash, who wears her braid as his headband until the day Urhi is revealed as the true assassin.

Hittite generals and military leaders
Rusafa 
The leader of the Hittite archers, he is highly loyal to Yuri and Kail.  Free-spirited and easygoing, he nevertheless falls under Nakia's control at one point.  His name is often translated as "Lucifer" due to the ambiguity of the katakana used in the original Japanese.

Rusafa's unrequited love for Yuri makes him go out of his way to protect her, even if it means disobeying orders from his superiors. When he finds that Kail and Yuri are already in love (at which point he too loves her), he is somewhat dismayed when Kail announces marriage. Just as Kash keeps Ursula's hair as a keepsake, Rusafa wears the obsidian sliver Yuri had passed to him to save his life in volume 17 around his neck as a sign of his devotion for her. After meeting him, Hathor Nefert (Ramses' sister) falls in love with him even though she is aware that he is in love with Yuri. However, before he dies, he seems to have been developing feelings of respect and admiration for Nefert. Rusafa is killed by Nakia at her final attempt at the lives of Yuri and Kail, thereby stopping Nakia for good.

Kash  
The leader of the Hittite chariots, and a guard of Prince Kail. He falls in love with Ursula not long after she comes to live in the palace.  Following her execution, he wears a braided band made from her hair around his head.

Mittannamuwa  
The leader of the Hittite infantry, he does not play much of a role in palace politics, as he is considerably older and spends most of his time out in the field.

Shubas 
The second commander of the Hittite archers, he is first introduced in book thirteen of the series, having gone to war with Egypt along with Mursili II, as Shubas' superior officer is serving the second army in Arzawa with Yuri. Like his fellow officer Zora, he seems to be largely inexperienced at first, a fact remarked upon by Kikkuri.

Zora  
The second commander of the Hittite infantry, he is first introduced in book thirteen of the series, having gone to war with Egypt along with Mursili II, as Zora's superior officer is serving the second army in Arzawa with Yuri. Like his fellow officer Shubas, he seems to be largely inexperienced at first, a fact remarked upon by Kikkuri.

In Volume 20, it is discovered that critical information is being leaked from behind the Hittite lines to Egyptian forces. Zora is discovered to be the informant; however, it is to Queen Nakia that he is submitting the information, who in turn has been forwarding it to the Egyptians. When confronted, Zora said that in exchange for this deed, he had been promised a promotion, citing jealousy against Shubas, who had been promoted while Zora had not, despite the two of them being close friends and having entered the Hittite armies at roughly the same time.

Egyptians
User Ramses 
A military officer from a noble family. In the manga, he is easily distinguished by his heterochromatic eyes (the left one is sepia, the right one is golden) and blond hair. He has a lot of sisters, most chiefly among them Nefert. His name is sometimes romanized as Usr Ramses.

Ramses initially encounters Yuri while on patrol near the Egyptian-Hittite border awaiting Zannanza's caravan.  He is intrigued by Yuri's ingenuity and bravery in preventing a war between Egypt and the Hittites following Zannanza's assassination, and requests to be assigned to Hattusa as a military liaison.  His true motive is revealed when he later kidnaps Yuri.  He tells her he has ambitions of becoming the next Egyptian pharaoh by ousting the current, corrupt leaders of the Egyptian 18th Dynasty.  To do this, he needs a woman of his own caliber, like Yuri, to be his future queen.

His first and second attempts to kidnap her are foiled by Kail. A third attempt is successful when a desperate Rusafa seeks his help when Yuri is weakened and in danger of dying after a shipwreck which also causes Yuri to have a miscarriage.  After Rusafa escapes Egypt and informs Kail that Yuri did not die in the shipwreck, Kail sends Ilbani, Hadi, Ryui, and Shala to Egypt. By this time, Ramses, who had initially only wanted Yuri because of his ambitions, has truly fallen in love with her. But soon after Kail's servants arrive, Egyptian soldiers come to arrest Yuri for interfering with an official's attempt to cut off the hand of a child. Ramses goes in her stead to Queen Nefertiti's palace. After Yuri rescues him from death at her hands, he gives her a document found in Queen Nefertiti's palace which concerns Queen Nakia's betrayal before she goes back to Kail.

Later, Ramses and Kail fight to a draw at the Battle of Kadesh at the Orontes River, and Ramses accepts defeat and asks Yuri to bear a daughter to marry his son (a wish which does not actually come to pass, but is finally consummated by their grandchildren). He later becomes Ramses I, first Pharaoh of the Egyptian 19th Dynasty. (In actual history, Ramses was known as Paramesse prior to succeeding Horemheb, the historical pharaoh of this period. The actual User Ramses would be Ramses II, a contemporary of Mursilli II's son, Muwatalli, and during whose reign the actual Battle of Kadesh occurred, which eventually resulted in the oldest known peace treaty, the Ramses–Hattusili Treaty.)

Hathor Nefert 
The oldest of Ramses younger sisters is a free-spirited and flirtatious personality.  During the time when Yuri is in captivity in Egypt, Nefert comes to view her as a little sister, and also takes a romantic interest in Rusafa even though she is aware that he is in love with Yuri. After, Rusafa dies, she is shown grieving for him. Like Ramses, she has blonde hair, though she wears a black wig to look more native.

Ankhesenamen
The daughter of Nefertiti and the wife of Tutankhamen.  When Tutankhamen dies, her hand in marriage is offered to a son of the Hittite king, but this deal is never completed due to treachery, and she is married off to a high-level government official, Ay.

Horemheb
The pharaoh who rules Egypt by the time Yuri arrives there (volume 20 of the series). In the series he is actually a weak puppet king under Nefertiti's control.

Ay 
A formerly a high-level (though largely incompetent) government official, he ascends to the position of Pharaoh after the failure of Ankhesenamen's arranged marriage to the Hittite Empire.  Ramses sees him as a personification of the corruption of the Egyptian 18th Dynasty, having married a girl "young enough to be his granddaughter".

Animals
Aslan 
Yuri's black war horse, whom only Yuri can ride or control. (In volume 13, Aslan is referred to as a "she," which may - or may not - be different from the original translation.) In the mythology surrounding her, Ishtar as a goddess is said to have ridden a lion into battle, and Yuri is often depicted as such, since in the Turkish language Aslan means "lion".

Shimshek 
Yuri's hawk, raised by her from a chick. He is usually kept in a wicker basket when not out.

Characters from Yuri’s time
Yuri's family 
Very little is shown of them beyond the initial pages of the manga, but it is assumed they are a normal Japanese family. In volume 28 it is revealed that several of Yuri's daughters and granddaughters were named after her sisters.

Satoshi Himuro 
 is a classmate and long-time friend of Yuri. Towards the beginning of the story, Satoshi and Yuri had just officially become a couple: the story opens with their first kiss. While they were out on a date, Yuri was grabbed by the queen by way of a snow puddle. Yuri misses Satoshi for the first few months in Anatolia, but his memory fades gradually with time.

In a short comic included in the fan-book, it is revealed Himuro has become a professor of Hittite history, and is married to Yuri's younger sister, Eimi. While excavating the tomb of Ishtar at Hattusa, his grad students uncover tablets recording the exploits of Mursili II and his Tawananna Ishtar, written by Illvani's son.  This short comic unofficially closes the storyline.

Others
Talos 
The headman of the Hatti people, keeper of the secret of iron making, and father to Hadi, Ryui, Shala, and Tito.  He is one of the first to see the true potential in Yuri ("proving" her claim as Ishtar by asking her to pick a blade from his armory), and quietly supports her from behind the scenes throughout the course of the series.

Nadia 
The head concubine of Prince Mattiwaza, and younger sister of Queen Nakia. She initially plans to trick Mattiwaza into killing Yuri, but only because she was afraid of being replaced.  Though long suspected of being a spy for Queen Nakia or her birth kingdom of Babylonia, she has no intention of being a pawn of Nakia or Urhi, as she is genuinely in love with Mattiwaza, and even defends him with her life (which ultimately saves Mattiwaza and Yuri themselves as well).  Her selfless act redeems Mattiwaza, and they flee to Babylonia to seek out for a new life together. Following Mattiwaza's reinstatement as Mittani's king by Kail, she has likely since become his queen.

Guzel 
The daughter of the chairman of the Hittite senate, who claims her son is Prince Kail's while under the control of Queen Nakia. A gentle and understanding person, and previously one of the leading candidates to become Kail's queen, she still a close friend to Kail and has also come to appreciate Yuri as the only one Kail would ever take for his wife. Her son, whose father was really a traveling minstrel, was named after Kail.

Alexandra 
The first princess of Arzawa (a country to the west of the Hittites on the shores of the Aegean Sea), Alexandra is sent by her mother to surrender herself to Ishtar as a concubine, not realizing that Ishtar is female. After Arzawa becomes an ally of the Hittites, Alexandra, who has come to adore Yuri, spends a great deal of time in the Hittite kingdom and later becomes the love interest for Prince Juda.
 Alexandra is about 13 years old when she is first seen in book 13 of the series. In a slight difference to the Japanese edition, probably changed to appeal more to an American audience, the manga translation only mentions that Alexandra has been sent to "serve" Ishtar, not that she has been sent as a concubine.

Media

Manga

The manga series was written and illustrated by Chie Shinohara. Its chapters were serialized in the bimonthly manga anthology Shōjo Comic from January 5, 1995 to June 5, 2002. They were then collected and published in 28 tankōbon volumes by Shogakukan, and later republished in 16 bunkobon volumes. Viz Media announced on February 13, 2004 that they had acquired the series for an English-language release in North America, with volume 1 scheduled for a second-quarter release. Viz released volume 1 on June 23, 2004, and volume 28 was released on January 12, 2010.

Red River is also published in Vietnam by Tre Publishing House, in Germany by Egmont Manga & Anime, and in Italy by Star Comics.

Drama CDs
The series was adapted as a series of 8 drama CDs released in two "seasons" between 1997 and 2003. The cast for said drama CD series is as follows: 
 Yuri Ishtar: Minami Takayama
 Kail Mursili: Kazuhiko Inoue
 Queen Nakia: Yuriko Yamaguchi, later Misa Watanabe
 Urhi Shalma: Katsumi Toriumi, later Takahiro Sakurai
 Prince Mattiwaza: Kenyuu Horiuchi 
 Juda Haspasrupi: Ikue Ohtani
 Tito: Hiro Yuuki
 Ilbani: Haruki Sayama
 Hadi: Ai Orikasa
 Ryuhi: Chiemi Chiba, later Machiko Toyoshima
 Shala: Yukiko Fujikawa
 Ramses: Toshihiko Seki, later Takehito Koyasu
 Kikkuri: Tomokazu Seki
 Ursula: Yuko Nagashima
 Kash: Koji Yusa, later Hideo Ishikawa
 Zannanza: Hikaru Midorikawa
 Guzel: Miyuki Ishizuka

Books
An art book for Red River was released on February 24, 1999 and a fan-book on July 26, 2002.

Two novels based on the manga have been released, written and illustrated by Shinohara:
Volume 1 was published on May 24, 2007
Volume 2 was published on August 31, 2007

Reception
Red River won the Shogakukan Manga Award for the shōjo category in 2001.

As of May 2006, the manga had over 16 million copies in circulation. As of March 2019, the manga had over 20 million copies in circulation.

References

External links
Viz Media official website

1995 manga
Chie Shinohara
Shogakukan manga
Shōjo manga
Supernatural anime and manga
Viz Media manga
Winners of the Shogakukan Manga Award for shōjo manga
Inanna
Anime and manga about time travel
Hittite Empire